Think!: Why Crucial Decisions Can't Be Made in the Blink of an Eye is a non-fiction book by editor and journalist Michael R. LeGault, released in January 2006. It was published under Threshold Editions, a conservative publishing imprint under Simon & Schuster run by Mary Matalin.

Think claims to refute Blink, the best-selling 2005 book by Malcolm Gladwell. It argues that United States and the West are in decline because of an intellectual crisis. Think contends that blink-like snap judgments are the cause of major failures such as the Hurricane Katrina response.  Michael LeGault maintains that relying on emotion and instinct instead of reason and facts is ultimately a threat to our freedom and way of life.

Summary

Think begins as a critique of the decline of critical thinking in America. LeGault briefly mentions Blink as the height of this irrationality, but moves on to other failures in government, schools, media, and industry.

LeGault offers several examples of irrationality and mediocrity throughout the book:

 Poor decision-making at General Motors and the decline of the American auto industry.
 The politically correct reaction to remarks by Lawrence Summers, regarding gender differences.
 The failures of affirmative action to close the achievement gap.
 Sensationalist journalism, and the decline of newspaper readership.
 Over-emphasis on stress relief in marketing and media.
 The banning of DDT by the Environmental Protection Agency, in reaction to the book Silent Spring.
 The rise of relativism, as described by Allan Bloom in his book, Closing of the American Mind.

Much of the book deals with examples of failures or anomalies in American achievements. LeGault often attributes these shortcomings to a growing attitude or influential group. On page 93, he describes the problem of over-medicating children with Attention Deficit Disorder and Attention-deficit hyperactivity disorder:

In view of LeGault's description of the problem, he closes the book by offering solutions. Specifically, he calls for higher standards, especially among parents and schools.

Reception
The book received praise for its analysis and refutation of the points brought up by Gladwell. However, LeGault has been criticized as a dealer of conspiracy theories as the book occasionally attributes the problems in American society to specific groups.

References

External links
Official webpage
Author's presentation at The Heritage Foundation on C-SPAN

2006 non-fiction books
Psychology books
Threshold Editions books